Cyperus multispicatus is a species of sedge that is native to Southeast Asia. It is an annual plant.

The species was first formally described by the botanist Johann Otto Boeckeler in 1874.

See also 
 List of Cyperus species

References 

multispicatus
Taxa named by Johann Otto Boeckeler
Plants described in 1874
Flora of the Andaman Islands
Flora of Bangladesh
Flora of Java
Flora of Myanmar
Flora of Vietnam